Agnès Pannier-Runacher (born 19 June 1974; née Agnès Runacher) is a French business executive and politician of La République En Marche! (LREM) who has been serving as Minister of Energy in the government of Prime Minister Élisabeth Borne since 2022. She previously was Secretary of State for Economy and Finance in the governments of successive Prime Ministers Édouard Philippe and Jean Castex from 2018 to 2022.

Early life and education
Pannier-Runacher was born as the daughter of a top executive at oil company Perenco. She is a graduate of HEC Paris (1995), Sciences Po and the École nationale d'administration (ENA), where her classmates included Alexis Kohler.

Civil service career
Pannier-Runacher joined the French Civil Service in 2000. She first worked at the Inspection générale des finances and then joined the Assistance Publique – Hôpitaux de Paris in a managerial role from 2003 to 2006. In 2006 she joined the Caisse des dépôts et consignations as deputy director in charge of strategy and finances. In 2009 she became executive director of the Strategic Investment Fund.

Business career
Pannier-Runacher joined the private company Faurecia in 2011. In 2013 she became deputy director at the Compagnie des Alpes in charge of development and performance of skiing and leisure centers.

Political career
Pannier-Runacher was an early supporter of Emmanuel Macron during the 2017 French presidential election and is a member of the La République En Marche! party.

Pannier-Runacher was appointed as Secretary of State for Economy and Finance, serving under the leadership of minister Bruno Le Maire, on 16 October 2018. At the time of her appointment, she was the highest-paid official to join the government.  

Early in her tenure, Pannier-Runacher oversaw the 2.8 billion euros auction of 5G frequencies conducted by French regulator ARCEP in October 2020.

During the COVID-19 pandemic in France, Pannier-Runacher was put in charge of organizing and reinforcing the production and supply of materials for health care personnel and institutions, such as respirators, personal protective equipment and swabs. She also oversaw the ramp-up of the production of face masks in France. 

Pannier-Runacher was a candidate in the 16th arrondissement of Paris in the 2020 municipal elections but was ultimately defeated. In early 2021, she announced her candidacy in that year's elections for the Regional Council of Hauts-de-France.

In January 2022, Pannier-Runacher and Élisabeth Moreno jointly published a book on feminism.

Other activities
 Elis, Independent Member of the Board of Directors (2014–2018) 
 Bourbon, Independent Member of the Board of Directors (2009–2018)

Personal life
Pannier-Runacher is in a relationship with Nicolas Bays, a former Socialist MP and longtime Macron supporter. She has three children.

In 2021, Pannier-Runacher moved to Lens, Pas-de-Calais, into a property rented by Bays from an estate company controlled by heirs of the late Olivier Dassault since 2017.

References

1974 births
Living people
La République En Marche! politicians
HEC Paris alumni
Sciences Po alumni
École nationale d'administration alumni
Inspection générale des finances (France)
21st-century French women politicians
Politicians from Paris
Knights of the Ordre national du Mérite
Members of the Borne government